Ripcordz are a Canadian punk rock band, formed in Montreal in 1980. They have released 15 full-length albums and continue to tour extensively as a three-piece band.

The band has undergone numerous lineup changes through its history, with vocalist and guitarist Paul Gott as the only remaining original band member.

History
The band was formed in 1980, playing their first show at Montreal's Le Steppe. Gott, at the time a journalism student at Concordia University, initially performed only on guitar, but took over as vocalist after the original vocalist sang the show in a vocal style more reminiscent of Robert Plant than punk rock.

The band released their debut album, Ripcordz Are Go(d), in 1988 on Og Records.  After that label folded in 1990, Gott launched EnGuard Records, releasing the album A Right Is a Right that year. Gott simultaneously ran his own typesetting business.

In 1992, they released the albums There Ain't No 'H' in Ripcordz, Dork-Face and Kidnoise.

In 1994, the band released Canadian As Fuck. Later the same year, 12 bands contributed covers of the band's songs to the tribute album Ripcordz As Fuck. Around the same time as the tribute album's release, Ripcordz organized an all-ages show featuring 18 bands.

In 1998, the band released Is That a Squeegee In Your Pocket Or Are You Just Happy to See Me?, their first album to be released on another label since their debut. By this time, Gott was working as a news producer for Montreal television station CKMI. They have continued to release albums, including It's Never Too Late to Annoy Your Parents, I Went to the Summit of the Americas and All I Got Was This Lousy Tear Gas Canister in the Back of the Head, What If They Held a Revolution and Nobody Came?, 100,000 Watts of Pure Power (At Least That's What We Tell All the Girls), Double Your Punk, Double Your Fun, Dead or Alive in '92, Black, Made in Montreal and War on Xmas, as well as a reissue of Ripcordz Are Go(d) in 2004.

By the time of the band's 2014 album Made in Montreal, Gott was estimating that the band had played at least 3,000 shows across Canada. He was working at this time as a news producer for the local CBC News on CBMT.

Current members

 Paul Gott – 1980–present – vocals, guitar
 Alexandre Gauthier – 1999–2008, 2010–2012, 2016-present – vocals, bass 
 François Demers –2022-present - bass, vocals
 Josh Taugher  2021–present – drums

Former members
 François Demers – 1990–1999, 2003-2019 – drums
 Ian Campeau – 2002-2003 – drums
 Simon Cloutier – 1999-2001 – drums
 John Isherwood – 1991-1992 – bass
 Danny Laflamme – 1992–1995, 2008-2009 – bass
 Chris Moroz – 1995-1999 – bass
 Phil O'Neill – 1988-1990 – drums
 Alexandre Roy – 2012–2017 – drums
 Ian Swinson – 1988-1991 – bass

Discography
 Greatest Hits (1986)
 Ripcordz Are Go(d) (1988)
 A Right is a Right (1990)
 There Ain't No 'H' in Ripcordz, Dork-Face (1992)
 Kidnoise (1992)
 Canadian as Fuck (1994)
 Re-Cordz (1995)
 Shut Up and Pogo (1996)
 Your Mother Wears Army Boots, But Man She Looks So Cool (1996)
 Is That a Squeegee In Your Pocket Or Are You Just Happy to See Me? (1998)
 It's Never Too Late to Annoy Your Parents (2000)
 I Went to the Summit of the Americas and All I Got Was This Lousy Tear Gas Canister in the Back of the Head (2002)
 What If They Held a Revolution and Nobody Came? (2003)
 100,000 Watts of Pure Power (At Least That's What We Tell All the Girls) (2006)
 Double Your Punk, Double Your Fun (2006)
 Dead or Alive in '92 (2008)
 Black (2010)
 Made in Montreal (2014)
 War on Xmas (2015)
 The Vinyl Countdown (2017)
 Punk East vs. Punk West (4-band split vinyl, 2019)
 Don't Buy the First Album, Jerk-Wad, Get This One! (2020)

References

Musical groups established in 1980
Musical groups from Montreal
Canadian punk rock groups
Anarcho-punk groups
English-language musical groups from Quebec
1980 establishments in Quebec